Basil Lee Whitener (May 14, 1915 – March 20, 1989) was a Democratic U.S. Representative from North Carolina between 1957 and 1969.

Whitener was born in York County, South Carolina on May 14, 1915, and was educated in the public schools of Gaston County, North Carolina. He graduated from Lowell High School in 1931 and from Rutherford College in 1933, attending the University of South Carolina from 1933 to 1935 and graduating from Duke University Law School in 1937. He was admitted to the North Carolina bar in 1937 and commenced practice of law in Gastonia, North Carolina.

In 1941 Whitener was elected to the North Carolina House of Representatives and was renominated in 1943 but resigned to enter the United States Navy. He served as a gunnery officer until November 1945, leaving with a rank of lieutenant. Whitener was appointed solicitor, fourteenth solicitorial district, in January 1946 and elected in November 1946, reelected in 1950 and 1954, and served until December 31, 1956. In 1948, he was a delegate to the Democratic National Convention.

Whitener was elected as a Democrat to the Eighty-fifth and to the five succeeding Congresses (January 3, 1957 – January 3, 1969); he was an unsuccessful candidate for reelection in 1968 to the Ninety-first Congress and an unsuccessful candidate for election in 1970 to the Ninety-second Congress. He resumed the practice of law.

Whitener was a resident of Gastonia, North Carolina until his death there on March 20, 1989.

External links

1915 births
1989 deaths
University of South Carolina alumni
People from York County, South Carolina
People from Gastonia, North Carolina
Democratic Party members of the United States House of Representatives from North Carolina
20th-century American politicians